Lakshmi Stores was an Indian Tamil-language soap opera directed by K.Sulaiman, written by veteran director Sundar C and produced by Avni Telemedia which premiered in Sun TV on 24 December 2018 and ended on 25 January 2020.  It starred film actresses Kushboo Sundar, Nakshatra Nagesh and Hussain Ahmed Khan.

Synopsis 
Mahalingam is the family's patriarch and founder of the traditional textiles showroom, Lakshmi Stores, but guilt-stricken with a past secret. His daughter-in-law, Mahalakshmi, nurtures the family and the close-knit staff with her selfless love. But she gets disowned by her husband Tiger Devaraj, when she seeks justice for Bhagyalakshmi, a kind-hearted young woman and earns the wrath of a vengeful Minister Shakunthala Devi, as well. Mahalakshmi is faced with an uphill task to save Lakshmi Stores and reunite with her family.

Fate takes a sharp turn when Ravi and Bhagyalakshmi get married secretly under inevitable consequences, after which they face a lot of problems from Shakuntala Devi and her family.

This story also revolves around how Ravi and Bhagyalakshmi, with the help of Mahalakshmi, pass the test of fate, face all their problems and reconcile with each other to live happily. At the end of the story, all is well.

Cast

Main cast 
 Kushboo Sundar as Mahalakshmi Devaraj, Eldest daughter-in-law of Mahalingam and wife of Devaraj 
Nakshatra Nagesh as Bhagyalakshmi Ravi, a worker in Lakshmi Stores and Ravi's wife, Youngest daughter-in-law of Mahalakshmi's family 
 Hussain Ahmed Khan as Raviprakash Mahalingam, Younger brother-in-law of Mahalakshmi and husband of Bhagyalakshmi

Recurring cast 
Sudha Chandran as Minister Shakunthala Devi, Mahalakshmi's enemy (Main Antagonist, Died in serial)
 Murali Mohan as Mahalingam, owner of Lakshmi Stores and Devaraj, Saravanan, Arjun, Ravi and Kamala's father
 Suresh as Tiger Devaraj a.k.a. Devaraj Mahalingam, Mahalakshmi's husband and Ravi's eldest brother
 Sruti Patil as Tejaswini Ravi "Teja"  (Shakuntala Devi's daughter, Antagonist)
 Tanisha Kuppanda as Mallikadevi "Mallika" Senthil (Senthil's wife, Antagonist)
 Delhi Kumar as Thillainathan, also known as Thillai (Bhagyalakshmi, Vanitha and Senthil's grandfather and co-owner of Lakshmi Stores) 
 Nanditha Jennifer / Sherin Janu as Kamala Mahalingam (Ravi's younger sister) 
 Rekha Krishnappa as Chamundeshwari Varadhan (Shakuntala Devi's half-sister, Antagonist)
 Swathi Thara as Dr. Uma Saravanan (Saravanan's wife, Antagonist) 
 Nisha Yazhini as Vanitha (Bhagyalakshmi's younger sister)
 Delhi Ganesh as Rajendran (Mahalingam's Closest Friend)
 Samson T Wilson as Dr. Saravanan Mahalingam (Ravi's second elder brother)
 Saakshi Siva as Raju (Shakuntala Devi's half-brother, Antagonist)
 Aravind Khathare as Senthilnathan "Senthil" Thillainathan (Bhagyalakshmi and Vanitha's elder brother, Thillainathan's grandson)
 Deepa Shankar as Ponnamma (Maid in Ravi's house) 
 Giridharan as Arjun (Ravi's third elder brother)
 Anjali Rao as Raja Rajeshwari, also called Raji (a worker who was a best friend for Bhagyalakshmi and Mahalakshmi). 
 Sandeep as Kandhaswamy 
 Fouzil Hidhayah as Dhivya (Mallika's sister)
 Diya Palakkal as Priya (Devaraj and Shyamala's daughter)  
 Pari as Meenu (Senthil and Mallika's daughter)
 Feroz Khan as Ganeshan
 Bayilvan Ranganathan as Dayalan (Shakuntala Devi's P.A., Antagonist)
 Monkey Ravi as Uthaman (Shakuntala Devi's PA and Ponnamma's Ex-Fiancé)
Vichu Vishwanath as Varadarajan also called Varadan (Chamundeshwari's husband, Antagonist)
Abitha as Dr. Shyamala (second wife of Devaraj and Priya's biological mother)
 Nisha as Maragatham 
 Smaleen Monica as Latha Saravanan
 Vinay UJ as Rajkumar (Shakunthala Devi's son, Antagonist)
 Saleema as Janaki Amma 
 K. S. G. Venkatesh as Uma's father
 Dhakshayini as Uma's mother (Antagonist)
 Nithya Ram as DC Nithya (Mahalakshmi's cousin sister)
 Shyam Ji as Shyam (Ravi's friend and Vanitha's love interest)

Production and release 
The shooting of the serial commenced in October 2018. This marks the veteran actress Kushboo Sundar's full-fledged return to television silverscreen after a hiatus of 5 years.

Dubbed versions

Crossover and special episodes
 On 18 January 2019, Kanmani had a crossover with Lakshmi Stores.
From 13 May 2019 – 18 May 2019, Roja had a crossover with Lakshmi Stores.
From 16 September 2019 to 21 September 2019, Lakshmi Stores had a one-hour special episode from 9PM to 10PM IST.

References

External links
 

Sun TV original programming
Tamil-language television shows
2018 Tamil-language television series debuts
2010s Tamil-language television series
2020 Tamil-language television series endings